Khoshkeh Rud or Khoshkeh Rood may refer to:

 Khoshkeh Rud, Ardabil
 Khoshkeh Rud, Isfahan
 Khoshkeh Rud, Kerman
 Khoshkeh Rud, Lorestan
 Khoshkeh Rud, Markazi
 Khoshkeh Rud, Mazandaran
 Pain Khoshkeh Rud, Mazandaran Province
 Khoshkeh Rud, Zanjan

See also
 Khoshk Rud (disambiguation)